The National Assembly is the elected lower house of Bhutan's bicameral Parliament which also comprises the Druk Gyalpo (Dragon King) and the National Council. It is the more powerful house.

Current National Assembly 

The current National Assembly has 47 members, first elected in the inaugural general election on March 24, 2008. Jigme Thinley's Druk Phuensum Tshogpa (DPT) Party won a landslide victory, securing 45 seats. The People's Democratic Party (PDP) won the other two, but its leader, Sangay Ngedup, lost the election in his constituency.

Under the 2008 Constitution, Article 12, section 1, the National Assembly consists of a maximum of 55 members directly elected by the citizens of constituencies within each Dzongkhag (District). Under this single-winner voting system, each constituency is represented by a single National Assembly member; each of the 20 Dzongkhags must be represented by between 2–7 members. Constituencies are reapportioned every 10 years (Art. 12, § 2). The National Assembly meets at least twice a year (Art. 12, § 5), and elects a Speaker and Deputy Speaker from among its members (Art. 12, § 3). Members and candidates are allowed to hold political party affiliation.

The 2013 National Assembly election resulted in large increase in percentage of PDP members, who will hold 32 seats to the DPT's 15 when the new assembly convenes.

History
The National Assembly was originally decreed in 1953 by King Jigme Dorji Wangchuck. The National Assembly began as a unicameral parliament within the King's framework for democratization. In 1971, King Jigme Dorji empowered the National Assembly to remove him or any of his successors with a two-thirds majority. The procedure for abdication remains a part of Bhutan's Constitution of 2008, with the addition of a three-fourths majority in a joint sitting of Parliament (i.e., including the National Council) to confirm the involuntary abdication as well as a national referendum to finalize it. (Art. 2)

Electoral system
The 47 members of the National Assembly are elected from single-member constituencies. Primary elections are held in which voters cast votes for parties. The top two parties are then able to field candidates in the main round of voting, in which members are elected using first-past-the-post voting.

Speakers
Complete list of speakers of the National Assembly.

Constituencies

The National Assembly, the lower of the Parliament of Bhutan, consists Members of Parliament (MPs). Each MP represents a single geographic constituency. Currently, there are 47 National Assembly constituencies.

National Assembly constituencies are distributed among the dzongkhags in proportion to their registered voter population as recommended by the Delimitation Commission, provided that "no Dzongkhag shall have less than two more than seven National Assembly constituencies."

Gelegphu (NA1301) constituency has the highest number of registered voter population with 16,283 registered voters; Khatoed_Laya (NA0402) constituency has the lowest number of registered voter population with 966 registered voters.

Out of the 20 dzongkhags of Bhutan, Trashigang, with five constituencies, has the highest number of National Assembly constituencies. Samtse, with four constituencies, has the second highest number of National Assembly constituencies. Mongar and Pema Gatshel, with three constituencies each, share the third highest position. All of the other 16 dzongkhags have two constituencies each.

The table below lists the 47 National Assembly constituencies with the name of the dzongkhag they are in, the number of constituent gewogs, and the number of registered voters.

See also
Politics of Bhutan
List of political parties in Bhutan
Elections in Bhutan
2008 Bhutanese National Assembly election
2013 Bhutanese National Assembly election
2018 Bhutanese National Assembly election
Parliament of Bhutan
National Council of Bhutan
Bhutanese legislation
Constitution of Bhutan

Notes

References

External links

 
Bhutan
Parliament of Bhutan
1953 establishments in Bhutan